First Edition is an Australian breakfast television news program broadcast on Sky News Australia. The program is currently hosted by Peter Stefanovic. The program is one of four breakfast news programs in Australia, competing with Sunrise, Today and News Breakfast. The program airs seven days a week.

The program is unusual for the fact that since 2014 it is broadcast from two locations, with Jayes co-hosting from the Sky News centre in the Sydney suburb of Macquarie Park, and Gilbert hosting from studios in Parliament House, Canberra. Additionally, the program also transitions into political commentary program AM Agenda at 8:30am AEST, which Gilbert hosted solo until October 2018, after which he was joined by Jayes.

Weekend editions of the program were trimmed with the launch of Saturday Edition and Sunday Edition from 9 July 2016. Amy Greenbank, Tom Connell and Leanne Jones have served as substitute anchors of the program.

History
The program is one of the longest running formats still broadcast on Sky News, having been on-air since at least 2002. Previous presenters of the program have included John Gatfield, Michael Willesee, Jr., Vanessa Grimm (née Trezise), Amber Sherlock, Leigh Hatcher, Susanne Latimore, Nina Stevens (née May) and Terry Willesee. Brooke Corte stepped down as host in September 2018 to become primetime anchor of Your Money, and was replaced by Laura Jayes.

Peter Stefanovic replaced Kieran Gilbert as co-anchor in July 2019.

Special editions
On 7 November 2014, the program was broadcast from a Sydney Airport aircraft hangar, following a recent partnership deal between Sky News and Qantas. As part of the arrangement, Corte presented in-flight news bulletins on Qantas flights.

References

External links
Sky News Official site

Sky News Australia
Australian non-fiction television series
English-language television shows
2010s Australian television series
Breakfast television in Australia